11 Hoyt is a residential skyscraper in the Downtown Brooklyn neighborhood of Brooklyn, New York, designed by architect Studio Gang with executive architect Hill West and developed by real estate conglomerate Tishman Speyer.

History and construction
Tishman Speyer purchased the site in August 2015. Three lenders—JPMorgan Chase, Starwood Property Trust, and iStar—provided $380 million in financing for the deal. The building's facade was constructed in Canada. The building topped out in June 2019, and was completed in 2021. The building is Tishman Speyer's first residential building in New York City. 

Sales for condominiums in the building launched in September 2018.

The building is part of the larger Tishman-led project to redevelop the former Macy's branch in Brooklyn.

Design

The building's exterior somewhat resembles that of 8 Spruce Street, designed by architect Frank Gehry. Jeanne Gang has said the building's facade was inspired by townhouses in Brooklyn, many of which include bay windows. The interiors were designed by Michaelis Boyd, and the units have two possible color palettes.

Usage
The building is residential, with 480 condominium residences. It also includes  of retail space. The day care Petits Poussins signed a lease for space in the building in June 2021.

See also
 List of tallest buildings in Brooklyn

References

Condominiums and housing cooperatives in Brooklyn
Buildings and structures under construction in the United States
Skyscrapers in Brooklyn
Studio Gang Architects buildings
Downtown Brooklyn